Joseph Mar Dionysius is Metropolitan of Calcutta Diocese of Malankara Orthodox Syrian Church.

References

1956 births
Living people
Malankara Orthodox Syrian Church bishops